American rapper Black Rob released three studio albums, one mixtape, and five singles (including two as a featured artist).

Albums

Studio albums

Mixtapes

Singles

As lead artist

As featured artist

References

Hip hop discographies
Discographies of American artists